Zarr is a surname. Notable people with the surname include:

Fred Zarr (born 1954), American musician, songwriter, and song producer
Sara Zarr (born 1970), American writer

See also
Barr (surname)
Carr (surname)
Zar (disambiguation)